The Šiauliai–Jelgava power line is an electricity link (interconnector) in the Baltic transmission system (synchronous with the IPS/UPS system) between Lithuania and Latvia. The overhead power line is one of seven interconnections between the two countries and one of the four 330 kV power transmission lines between Lithuania and Latvia.

History
In 1956, the Lithuanian national electricity grid was established with a link between the Petrašiūnai Power Plant in Kaunas and the Rekyva Power Plant in Šiauliai. Šiauliai (Lithuania) and Jelgava (Latvia) were connected in 1962 creating the first ever transmission link between the two neighbouring countries. It was also the first ever 330 kV power line in Lithuania.

See also
 List of high-voltage transmission links in Lithuania
 Other links between Lithuania and Latvia: Panevėžys–Aizkraukle power line, Visaginas–Līksna power line and Klaipėda–Grobiņa power line.

References

External links
 Litgrid Official website

Electric power transmission systems in Lithuania
Electric power infrastructure in Latvia
High-voltage transmission lines
1962 establishments in Lithuania
1962 establishments in Latvia